Rémi Bezançon (born 25 March 1971) is a French director and screenwriter.

Life and career 
Rémi Bezançon studied at the École Supérieure de Réalisation Audiovisuelle (ESRA) in Paris and the École du Louvre. 
In 2005, he released his first feature film Ma vie en l'air with Marion Cotillard, Gilles Lellouche and Vincent Elbaz before meeting with success in 2008 with The First Day of the Rest of Your Life. 

In 2011, he directed Un heureux événement, his third feature film adapted from the autobiographical best-seller by Eliette Abécassis, with Louise Bourgoin, Pio Marmaï and Josiane Balasko. The soundtrack, as with his previous films, is composed by Sinclair.

Filmography

Awards 
 Césars 2009: nominated for César Award for Best Writing for The First Day of the Rest of Your Life
 Césars 2009: nominated for César Award for Best Director for The First Day of the Rest of Your Life
 Césars 2009: nominated for César Award for Best Film for The First Day of the Rest of Your Life.

External links 

 

1971 births
Living people
French male screenwriters
French screenwriters
Film directors from Paris
French-language film directors